Phil Walker may refer to:

Phil Walker (basketball) (born 1956), retired American basketball player
Phil Walker (footballer, born 1954) (1954–2022), English football player for Millwall
Phil Walker (footballer, born 1957), English football player for Chesterfield
Phil Walker (journalist) (1944–2011), British newspaper editor

See also
Phillip Walker (musician) (1937–2010), American blues guitarist
Phillip Walker (American football), American football quarterback